Vuelta a Aragón is a professional bicycle road race held in Spain in May of each year. The event was first run in 1939, and was not held between 2006 and 2017. The future of the race is uncertain; there had been plans to organise it again, but an effort to revive it in 2009 failed due to a lack of sufficient sponsorship to be held. It was not until May 2018 that another race was organized; it was added to the UCI road calendar as a 2.1 road race event on the Europe Tour.

Winners

References

UCI Europe Tour races
Recurring sporting events established in 1939
1939 establishments in Spain
Sport in Aragon
Cycle races in Spain